Rodrigue César (born 14 April 1988) is a French-Martinique football midfielder, who plays for Colonial of the Martinique Championnat National.

Club career
In 2008, he signed with Martinique club US Robert. In 2010, he signed with French Ligue 2 side Istres and made his debut on 12 November against Vannes OC.

International career
César is a member of the Martinique national football team. He made his debut on 26 November 2010 in a 2010 Caribbean Championship match against Grenada. He played three times for Martinique.

References

External links
 

1988 births
Living people
People from Ducos
Martiniquais footballers
French footballers
Martinique international footballers
Association football midfielders
FC Istres players
AS Béziers (2007) players